Gilbert William Collett (1887 – 24 July 1964) was a British botanist and philatelist who signed the Roll of Distinguished Philatelists in 1952. He was the founder President of the British West Indies Study Circle.

Publications
Jamaica - Its Postal History, Postage Stamps, and Postmarks. 1928. (With Rev. C.S. Morton, L.C.C. Nicholson, and W.B. Edwards)

References

British philatelists
1887 births
1964 deaths
Signatories to the Roll of Distinguished Philatelists
Fellows of the Royal Philatelic Society London
British botanists